Zhuhai Zijing Middle School (colloquially known as) is located in Xiangzhou, Zhuhai, Guangdong, it's a first-class middle school in Zhuhai, also one of the Provincial Model Junior High Schools.

History 

Zhuhai Zijing Middle School was founded in 1960 as Xiangzhou Fishermen Middle School(香洲渔民中学; pinyin:Xiāngzhōu Yúmín Zhōngxúe). In 1962, it changed its name into Xiangzhou Middle School(香洲中学; pinyin:Xiāngzhōu Zhōngxúe) and Zhuhai No.1 High School(珠海市第一中学; pinyin:Zhūhai Shì Dìyī Zhōngxúe) in July 1981. In 1979, it set up the senior high department. The senior campus was being put into use at Meihua Xi Rd in 2000.

In 2008, the junior Dept was separated from Zhuhai No.1 High School and changed its name into the current one.

In 2011, the Zhuhai Taoyuan Middle School(珠海市桃园中学; pinyin:Zhūhǎi Shì Táoyuán Zhōngxúe) was merged into Zhuhai Zijing Middle School as Taoyuan Rd Campus(桃园路校区; pinyin:Táoyuán Lù Xiàoqū). The original campus was called Fenghuang Rd Campus(凤凰路校区; pinyin:Fènghuáng Lù Xiàoqū).

Campus facilities

Fenghuang Rd Campus 

 Canteen for teachers
 Canteen for students
 Campus small supermarket
 Garage
 Stadium: 300 m track, a football field, 4 basketball courts.
 Laboratory building: the ground floor has a small meeting room and a music room, the second to sixth floor have a number of physical, chemical, biological laboratories, the seventh floor has a karaoke for staff only.
 Dormitories: a small number of dormitories for staff and students with special requirements.
 Teaching buildings: 3 buildings for 3 Grades each.
 Small pond
 Rixin Pavilion
 Lecture hall
 Gym: including a basketball court, several storerooms, two simple stages on 2 floors each.

References 

Schools in China
Secondary Education in Zhuhai